Clayton railway station is a closed railway station on the North Coast railway line in Queensland. It is named after one of the early settlers in Bundaberg.

References

Disused railway stations in Queensland
North Coast railway line, Queensland